The International Purchasing & Supply Education & Research Association (IPSERA) is a learned society in the field of purchasing and supply management. Established in 1990 as PSERG (Purchasing and Supply Education and Research Group), it has over 300 members in more than 30 countries.

Conferences
The Annual Meeting of the IPSERA is held each year in late March or early April. Due to IPSERA's geographically diverse membership, the location of its annual meeting rotates amongst the continents.

Nodes and centers of excellence
IPSERA currently has 4 Academic Centers of Excellence and 11 Regional Nodes. Nodes are academic groups of a minimum of 5 persons who work in the field of purchasing and supply management. Nodes organize workshops or regional meetings that are supported by IPSERA.

Bursaries
IPSERA has several bursaries available to attend the IPSERA Conference and the IFPSM summer school.

Publications
IPSERA has no own journal. However, the Journal of Purchasing and Supply Management publishes a yearly special issue containing selected papers from the IPSERA annual meeting.

Notes

External links 
 

International professional associations
Supply chain management